Batrichthys is a genus of toadfishes.

Species
The recognized species in this genus are:
 Batrichthys albofasciatus J. L. B. Smith, 1934 (white-ribbed toadfish)
 Batrichthys apiatus (Valenciennes, 1837) (snakehead toadfish)

References

Batrachoididae